Kymen Sanomat (KySa) is a Finnish language daily newspaper published in the Kymenlaakso region of Finland.

History and profile
The newspaper was established in 1902. Kymen Sanomat has its editorial headquarters in Kotka. The paper is published in Hamina. The publisher is Sanoma Lehtimedia Oy which also publishes Etelä-Saimaa and Uutisvuoksi.

In 1991 Kymen Sanomat merged with Kotkan Sanomat.

Kymen Sanomat had approximately 62,000 readers in 2007.  The paper had a circulation of 24,216 copies in 2009.

References

External links
Official site

1902 establishments in Finland
Publications established in 1902
Daily newspapers published in Finland
Finnish-language newspapers
Mass media in Kotka